The 5ive is a television show that aired on BET. The show premiered on June 4, 2007, replacing Hotwyred. The show is hosted by Alesha Reneé, a winner in the "New Faces" contest. It is a half-hour show that counted down the five hottest people, places, events, gadgets, and websites. The last show aired on November 30, 2007.

Episode 1. 
(Originally aired: Monday June 18, 2007)
Show 101: Alesha Renee gives the scoop on the top 5 hottest people, places and gadgets.
The 5: Hip Hop Skate Clubs
The 4: Sex Tapes
The 3: Naked Cabbie
The 2: Sneaker Boutique
The 1: Taalam Acey

Episode 2. 
(Originally aired: Wednesday June 20, 2007)
Show 102: Alesha Renee gives the scoop on the hottest things. Including old 1980s trends, the new iPhone and more.
The 5: 80's Babies
The 4: Apple iPhone
The 3: imnotsigned.com
The 2: Toccara Strut Your Stuff
The 1: POW Magazine

Episode 3. 
(Originally aired: Monday June 25, 2007)
Show 103: Alesha Renee gives the scoop on the 5 hottest things right now including a new dance and a new mobile device.
The 5: Read A Book (Music Video)
The 4: Aunt Jackie (Dance)
The 3: Block Savvy (Website)
The 2: Young, Black & Fabulous (Website)
The 1: Helio Ocean (Mobile Device)

Episode 4. 
(Originally aired: Wednesday June 27, 2007)
Show 104: Alesha Renee gives the scoop on the five hottest things you should know about including an actress to watch for, and a new keyboard technology.
The 5: Paula Patton
The 4: Unique Cuts
The 3: BlueTooth Laser Keyboard
The 2: Naked Shopper
The 1: Barack Obama

BET original programming
2007 American television series debuts
2007 American television series endings